The 1901–02 Harvard Crimson men's ice hockey season was the fifth season of play for the program.

Season
Hopes were high for Harvard entering the season and the Crimson got off to a good start but were stymied by Yale in their third game. After defeating Princeton Harvard still had a chance to win the Intercollegiate Championship with two final games against the Bulldogs but the Elis proved to be better by taking both and ending Harvard's season on a sour note.

Though the result was disappointing the future was looking bright for Harvard; this was the last season that the Crimson would not finish with a winning intercollegiate record for 22 years.

Roster

Standings

Schedule and Results

|-
!colspan=12 style=";" | Regular Season

References

Harvard Crimson men's ice hockey seasons
Harvard
Harvard
Harvard
Harvard
Harvard